"Overdue" is a song by American record producer Metro Boomin featuring American rapper Travis Scott from the former's debut studio album Not All Heroes Wear Capes (2018). With additional production from Milan Beker, the song samples the Berlin Breakdown Version of "Anthonio" by Annie, from the 2014 film The Guest.

Composition
"Overdue" finds Travis Scott reflecting on feeling like he "overdid" himself with making hit songs and excessive partying, over an instrumental which prominently features a sped-up vocal sample of "Anthonio". Toward the end of the song, rapper 21 Savage provides background vocals through ad-libs, setting the stage for the next track on Not All Heroes Wear Capes, "Don't Come Out the House".

Critical reception
The song was well-received by music critics. In a review of the song, Karlton Jahmal wrote it "sounds like there was no other man on this planet that was made for this instrumental other than Trav." Neil Z. Yeung of AllMusic called it a highlight from Not All Heroes Wear Capes. Critics have also praised the transition into "Don't Come Out The House"; Marcus Blackwell of HipHopDX wrote, "Such tie-in beauty in is revealed when Travis Scott skates melodically on the icy joint 'Overdue,' which somehow seamlessly moves into the project's most menacing record 'Don't Come Out The House.'" Similarly, Thomas Hobbs of Highsnobiety considered it "a sign of just how brilliantly this record [Not All Heroes Wears Capes] is sequenced".

Charts

Certifications

References

2018 songs
Metro Boomin songs
Travis Scott songs
Song recordings produced by Metro Boomin
Songs written by Metro Boomin
Songs written by Travis Scott
Songs written by Hannah Robinson
Songs written by Annie (singer)
Songs written by Richard X